Bombayla Devi Laishram (born 22 February 1985) is an Indian archer. A member of the national recurve team representing India at the international events since 2007, she has won a silver medal at the World Archery Championships, and four gold, five silver, and four bronze medals at various editions of the Archery World Cup. Laishram peaked at no. 14 in the world rankings in March 2009.

Born in Imphal East, Manipur, Laishram began playing archery at the age of 11 and joined the Sports Authority of India under the guidance of her father. Having participated at the national level since 1997, she made her international debut in 2007. Laishram played as a regular member of the recurve team that represented India at the international circuit, winning gold medals at the 2011 Shanghai, and the 2013 Medellin, and the Wroclaw World Cup stages. She won her first international individual medal, a bronze at the Asian Archery Championships in 2013.

Laishram has represented India at the Olympics on three occasions, reaching the pre-quarterfinals twice. She has also won medals at other multi-sporting events, including a gold at the Commonwealth and a bronze at the Asian Games. Laishram was awarded the Arjuna Award in 2012 and the Padma Shri in 2019 by the Government of India for her contributions to sports.

Early life
Laishram was born on 22 February 1985, in Manipur to M. Jamini Devi, a local archery coach and Manglem Singh, the state coach for Manipur’s handball team. She started archery at the age of 11, and later joined the Sports Authority of India and started training there. Laishram revealed in an interview that she started archery following her family's tradition in the sport. She currently resides in Imphal, Manipur.

Career

Breakthrough and career-high ranking (2007–2009)
Laishram's breakthrough came in 2007, when she wonas a part of the women's recurve teamthe bronze medal at the 2007 Asian Archery Championships. She made her debut at the Archery World Cup in 2007. She was seeded no. 11 after the qualifications rounds, with a total score of 1313; the Indian team consisting of her, Dola Banerjee, and Chekrovolu Swuro were had the highest collective score. Laishram lost in the second round of the individual discipline, but reached the semifinals in the team event. India lost to Italy, but defeated Poland to win the bronze medal.

Laishram represented India at the 2008 Beijing Olympics in the women's individual as well as team events.  She, along with Banerjee and Pranitha Vardhineni was ranked sixth in the team event qualifiers. They got a bye in the round of 16, but lost to China by 206–211 in the quarterfinals. In the individual event, she was ranked 22nd in the qualifiers, but lost to Iwona Marcinkiewicz of Poland in the round of 64 in a keenly contested match 101–103.

Laishram reached her career high ranking of no. 14 in 2009, having won another bronze medal at the World Cup, earlier in the year.

World Cup and Commonwealth golds (2011–15)

Laishram was a part of the recurve team that represented India at the 2010 Commonwealth Games; she, Banerjee, and Deepika Kumari won the Gold medal defeating England in the final.

Beginning 2011, Laishram won a medal at every Archery World Cup until 2016; the run included the gold medal at the 2011 Shanghai World Cup, where the Indian recurve team beat Italy in the final. The Indian team was the no. 1 seed in the tournament, as they had finished at the top in the qualifications stage. Laishram, herself, was placed at no. 8 in the individual qualification round. She lost in the second of the knock-out stages to Mexico's Avitia Mariana in a shootout. Earlier in 2011, Laishram had won the bronze and silver medals in the recurve team event at the Second (held at Antalya, Turkey) and Third (held at Ogden, Utah) stages of the World Cup respectively.

At the 2012 London Olympics, she bowed out in the second round of the women’s individual recurve event losing 2–6 to Mexico’s Aída Román on 30 July 2012.  In the team event, India lost in the first round 211–210 to Denmark. Laishram won her first individual medal in November 2013 at the Asian Archery Championships, finishing in the third place.

Rio Olympics and beyond (2016–present)
Laishram was the part of the team that qualified for 2016 Rio Olympics. The Indian women's recursive team, consisting of Laishram, Kumari and Laxmirani Majhi, finished 7th in the ranking round. The team won their match against Colombia in the round of 16 before losing the quarterfinal match against Russia.

Bombayla Devi Laishram faced Laurence Baldauff of Austria in the Women's Individual Round of 64 encounter in the 2016 Olympics, she won the match 6–2 and progressed to the next round. In the Round of 32, Bombayla Devi faced Lin Shih-chia of Chinese Taipei. She won the match 6–2 and advanced to the Round of 16. However, she was not able to get past Alejandra Valencia of Mexico in the round of 16 and she lost with a score of 2 against 6.

Awards and recognition
In 2012, the Government of India awarded Laishram with the Arjuna Award, India's second highest sporting honour. She was later awarded the fourth highest national civilian honour, the Padma Shri in 2019.

References

External links
 

Living people
1985 births
Indian female archers
Olympic archers of India
Archers at the 2008 Summer Olympics
Archers at the 2012 Summer Olympics
Archers at the 2016 Summer Olympics
Commonwealth Games gold medallists for India
Shooters at the 2010 Commonwealth Games
Sportswomen from Manipur
Recipients of the Arjuna Award
People from Imphal East district
Archers at the 2010 Asian Games
Archers at the 2014 Asian Games
Commonwealth Games medallists in archery
21st-century Indian women
21st-century Indian people
Asian Games bronze medalists for India
Asian Games medalists in archery
Medalists at the 2010 Asian Games
Recipients of the Padma Shri in sports
Medallists at the 2010 Commonwealth Games